Senator Nielsen may refer to:

Jim Nielsen (born 1944), California State Senate
Mark Nielsen (attorney) (born 1961), Connecticut State Senate
Howard C. Nielson (1924–2020), Utah State Senate